is a Japanese footballer who currently plays for Hong Kong First Division club South China.

Career statistics

Club

Notes

References

External links
 Kohei Ito at HKFA

1988 births
Living people
Japanese footballers
Japanese expatriate footballers
Association football midfielders
Saitama SC players
Dreams Sports Club players
Kohei Ito
South China AA players
Hong Kong Premier League players
Japanese expatriate sportspeople in Hong Kong
Expatriate footballers in Hong Kong
Japanese expatriate sportspeople in Thailand
Expatriate footballers in Thailand